Ben Thanh Station (Vietnamese: Ga Bến Thành) is a future underground Ho Chi Minh City Metro interchange station on the future Line 1, Line 2, Line 3A, and Line 4A. Located in front of Ben Thanh Market, the station will serve as the central metro station in Ho Chi Minh City, Vietnam.

References 

Ho Chi Minh City Metro stations
Proposed buildings and structures in Vietnam
Railway stations scheduled to open in 2024